Figure skating at the 2011 Canada Winter Games was held at the St. Margaret's Center in Upper Tantallon, Nova Scotia.

The events will be held during the second week between February 21 and 24, 2011.

Medal table
The following is the medal table for alpine skiing at the 2011 Canada Winter Games.

Pre-novice events

Novice events

Special Olympic events

References

2011 in figure skating
2011 Canada Winter Games
2011 Canada Winter Games